The Austria national speedway team are motorcycle speedway national team from Austria. They were started in European Pairs Speedway Championship Finals two times.

World championships

Speedway World Cup

European Championships

Pairs

Team U-19

See also
 Motorcycle speedway
 Speedway Grand Prix of Austria

National speedway teams
Speedway
National